Maxwell Nii Abbey Quaye (born 2 February 1998) is a Ghanaian professional footballer who plays as a forward in the Ghanaian Premier League for Accra Great Olympics.

Career 
Quaye is the assistant captain of Accra Great Olympics. Quaye has been instrumental for Accra Great Olympics especially in the 2020–21 Ghana Premier League Season, scoring a brace in a 2–1 win against Liberty Professionals.

References 

Living people
1998 births
Ghanaian footballers
Ghana Premier League players
Accra Great Olympics F.C. players
Association football forwards
20th-century Ghanaian people
21st-century Ghanaian people